Daniel Weyman (born 1977) is an English actor known for his role as the Stranger in The Lord of the Rings: The Rings of Power.

Theatre 

He has appeared in stage productions such as Samuel West's Sheffield Crucible production of As You Like It (as Jaques) and the Chichester Festival Theatre's production of David Edgar's The Life and Adventures of Nicholas Nickleby. His portrayal of the title character earned him a nomination for 'Best Performance in a Play' at the 2006 TMA Awards. He played Anitpholus of Syracuse in the Whatsonstage.com Awards Best Shakespearean Production nominated The Comedy of Errors at the Open Air Theatre, Regent's Park in 2010. His work includes Kafka's Dick and King Lear at Theatre Royal, Bath, The Crucible directed by Tom Morris at the Bristol Old Vic (2015) and 4000 Days opposite Alistair McGowan at the Park Theatre (2016). He starred as Miles in Rex Pickett's adaptation of his own book, Sideways at the St James Theatre (2016) - the part made famous by Paul Giamatti in Alexander Payne's Oscar winning film adaptation of the same name. He earned rave reviews starring opposite Oscar winner F. Murray Abraham in Daniel Kehlman's new play The Mentor directed by Laurence Boswell which transferred from the Ustinov Studio to the West End's Vaudeville Theatre (2018).

Television 

Appearances include the 2005 Colditz and the BAFTA winning BBC drama Dunkirk. He played Matthew Cole in the 2004 "Midsomer Murders" episode The Straw Woman. He appeared in the award-winning Van Gogh: Painted with Words for the BBC in 2010. In 2013 he starred in Series 8 of Foyle's War for ITV, playing Adam Wainwright, the husband of the character played by Honeysuckle Weeks. In 2013 he played Alec Legge in Agatha Christie's Dead Man's Folly again on ITV. This was the last episode ever filmed by David Suchet as Poirot although it was the penultimate episode to air. In 2014 he reprised his role as Adam Wainwright in Series 9 of Foyle's War which was the last series produced. In 2016, Daniel played Max Thorndyke in the BBC1 drama Silent Witness series 20. His character is the husband of regular character Clarissa Mullery (Liz Carr). The new storyline was very well received and Daniel returned in series 21. In 2018, Daniel appeared in Vera opposite Brenda Blethyn. He played Northumbrian park ranger Jim Briscoe. In 2020, he was cast as the Stranger in the television series The Lord of the Rings: The Rings of Power.

Film 

He played Tom Jackson in his first lead cinema role in the film Just Inès (2010) and Arthur Havisham to Helena Bonham Carter's Miss Havisham in Mike Newell's film version of Great Expectations (2012). He has filmed scenes for Rupert Everett's film about Oscar Wilde, The Happy Prince, and Amma Asante's World War II forbidden love story, Where Hands Touch.

Audio 

He has guest starred in the Sapphire and Steel audio drama Perfect Day along with the Doctor Who audio drama The Butcher of Brisbane and won the Audible Best Narrator of 2017 award.

He has worked extensively in radio, audiobook and voice over. His reading of Andy McNab and Robert Rigby's Meltdown was voted No. 1 in the Independents Top 10 Children's audiobooks 2008. His reading of Young Sherlock Holmes: Death Cloud won a prestigious Best Audiobook of the Year Award from American publication AudioFile magazine. In 2013 the American Library Association entered his recording of Angelmaker by Nick Harkaway in The Listen List, their top 12 examples of outstanding audiobook narration whilst his recording of Crusher by Niall Leonard, made the ALA's Amazing Audiobooks for Young Adults list.

References

External links

Interview with Daniel and Honeysuckle on Lorraine, ITV

1977 births
Living people
English male stage actors
English male television actors
English male film actors